This is a list of films which placed number one at the weekend box office for the year 2015 in Thailand.

References

 

Thailand
2015 in Thailand
2015